Grimpella thaumastocheir, the velvet octopus, is the only species in the monotypic genus Grimpella, in the family Octopodidae. This species has a typical body length of 200 mm.  It is an found in offshore waters and is endemic to the seas off southeastern and southwestern Australia.

References

Octopuses
Cephalopod genera
Molluscs described in 1928